Qurdarik-e Sofla (also Romanized as Qūrdarīk-e Soflá; also known as Qūrdīk-e Pā'īn and Qūrdīk-e Soflá) is a village in Sokmanabad Rural District, Safayyeh District, Khoy County, West Azerbaijan Province, Iran. At the 2006 census, its population was 232, in 57 families.

References 

Populated places in Khoy County